Okkult is the eighth studio album by the heavy metal band Atrocity. It was released in 2013 on Napalm Records. With this album, the band returned to a death-metal sound, but also incorporated a symphonic metal edge.

Track listing
 "Pandaemonium" 
 "Death by Metal"
 "March of the Undying"
 "Haunted by Demons"
 "Murder Blood Assassination"
 "Necromancy Divine" 
 "Satans Braut" 
 "Todesstimmen"  
 "Masaya"
 "When Empires Fall to Dust"
 "Beyond Perpetual Ice" 
 "La Voisine"

Personnel
 Atrocity
 Alexander Krull – vocals, programming, samples	 
 Joris Nijenhuis – drums
 Sander van der Meer – guitars, backing vocals
 Thorsten Bauer – guitars, bass guitar, backing vocals

 Additional musicians
 Katie Halliday – effects
 Uwe Fichtner – backing vocals
 Fullmoon Choir – backing vocals
 Annette Nußbaum – violin
 Christel Fichtner – narration, backing vocals
 Lingua Mortis Orchestra 
 Liv Kristine – backing vocals

 Production
 Joris Nijenhuis – engineering (assistant)
 Sander van der Meer – engineering (assistant)
 Thorsten Bauer – engineering (assistant)
 Alexander Krull – producer, recording, engineering, mixing, mastering, cover concept
 Stefan Heilemann – artwork, photography, cover concept

References

Atrocity (band) albums
2013 albums
Napalm Records albums
Albums produced by Alexander Krull